Nurul Islam is an Indian politician. He was elected to the Assam Legislative Assembly from Mankachar in the 1972 Assam Legislative Assembly election as a member of the Indian National Congress. He served as member of the Lok Sabha representing Dhubri (Lok Sabha constituency). He was elected to 7th, 10th and 11th Lok Sabha.

Positions Held
 1972-78 Member, Assam Legislative Assembly.
 1983 Elected to Lok Sabha (Seventh).
 1983-84 Member, Consultative Committee, Ministry of Industry.
 1984-85 A.I.C.C. Observer to Karnataka and Orissa during the general elections. 
 1991 Re-elected to Lok Sabha (Tenth).
 1991-96 Member, Estimates Committee.
 Member, Consultative Committee on Ministry of Defence.
 1992-96 Member, Standing Committee on Defence.
 1996 Elected to Lok Sabha (Eleventh) for the third time.

Social and Cultural Activities
Established two colleges, six high schools, 13 M.E. Schools, 47 L.P. Schools in Mankachar, Assam during 1972-78 and also established two music schools at Dhubri (Assam).

Special Interests
Legal works, farming, horticulture, pisciculture, travelling, fishing and hunting.

Sports and Club
Minor games, Member, Evening Club, Dhubri, Assam.

Other Information
Professor, Law College, Dhubri, Vice-President, Apex Cooperative Bank, Dhubri for 3 years, President and Member of many educational institutions.

References

People from Dhubri district
India MPs 1980–1984
Living people
1931 births
Indian Muslims
Lok Sabha members from Assam
Members of the Assam Legislative Assembly
India MPs 1991–1996
Indian National Congress politicians
India MPs 1996–1997
University of Calcutta alumni
Gauhati University alumni
Assam MLAs 1972–1978